Gaspar Torrente Español, (13 October 1888 in Campo, Ribagorza, Aragon - 21 March 1970 in Barcelona,  Catalonia), was one of the early 20th century leaders and a founding father of Aragonese nationalism.

References 

1888 births
1970 deaths
People from Ribagorza